The MaK G 1202 BB is a four axle B'B' off-centre cab diesel-hydraulic locomotive built by Maschinenbau Kiel in Germany.

Design and operators
The locomotive is a light freight and shunting locomotive; twelve units were built for private railway operators in Germany including 3 for Rheinkalk GmbH (chalk and dolomite mineral company), 2 for Osthannoversche Eisenbahnen, 2 for RAG, and the remainder on various short and medium term leases.

See also
MaK G 1204 BB, similar design with MTU 396 engine replacing the MTU 331 engine

References

External links

Images: 

MaK locomotives
Standard gauge locomotives of Germany
Railway locomotives introduced in 1978
B-B locomotives